Treaty of Ulm can refer to one of several treaties signed in Ulm, Germany:

Treaty of Ulm (1326), establishing the joint rule of Frederick the Fair and Louis IV, Holy Roman Emperor in the Holy Roman Empire
Treaty of Ulm (1620), under which the Protestant Union established its neutrality in the conflict between Frederick V of the Palatinate and the Catholic League
Truce of Ulm (1647), establishing a truce between France, Sweden, and Bavaria during the Thirty Years' War